Join Jim Dale was a British television comedy series aired in 1969 on ITV. It was produced by Associated Television (ATV) and starred Jim Dale and featured guest stars such as Hattie Jacques, Roy Kinnear, Anna Quayle, Beryl Reid, Dame Sybil Thorndike, and Kenneth Williams.

All six episodes are believed to have been destroyed.

References

External links
Join Jim Dale on IMDb

1969 British television series debuts
1969 British television series endings
Lost television shows
English-language television shows
1960s British comedy television series